Occisor is a genus of parasitic flies in the family Tachinidae. There are at least three described species in Occisor.

Species
These three species belong to the genus Occisor:
 Occisor atratus Malloch, 1938
 Occisor inscitus Hutton, 1901
 Occisor versutus Hutton, 1901

References

Further reading

 
 
 
 

Tachinidae
Articles created by Qbugbot